Umiaites is a Late Jurassic (Tithonian stage) ammonitid included in the Olcostephanidae which is part of the Perisphinctaceae. The type is Umiaites rajnathi Spath, 1931.

The shell of Umiaites is large, reaching a diameter of 16 cm or greater, and evolute with a wide shallow umbilicus.  Flanks are flat to gently curving. Whorls overlap the previous by a fourth.

So far, Umiaites is known only from Kutch in western India and is considered endemic to the region. Related genera include Spiticeras and Proniceras, with different distribution.

References
The Genus Umiates Spath, 1931 (Ammonoidea) from the Tithonian (Late Jurassic) of Kutch, Western India. 

Ammonitida
Jurassic ammonites
Fossils of India
Tithonian life